The James E. Reynolds House, located east of Cameron off State Highway 112 in Le Flore County, Oklahoma is a castle which was built in 1911.  Also known as Reynolds Castle, it was listed on the National Register of Historic Places in 1977.

It is a 10-room stone castle built from stone quarried from a nearby hillside.  The castle was the work of James E. Reynolds (1837–1920).  Reynolds was a Confederate soldier in the American Civil War and successful entrepreneur and was in his words an '"unreconstructed Confederate."'

References 

National Register of Historic Places in Le Flore County, Oklahoma
Houses completed in 1911
LeFlore County, Oklahoma
Castles in the United States